María Urzúa may refer to:
María Guadalupe Urzúa Flores (1912-2004), Mexican politician
María José Urzúa (born 1983), Chilean actress